Baga Bogd (lit. "lesser saint") is a mountain of the Gobi-Altai Mountains and located in the Övörkhangai Province in Mongolia.

See also
 List of Ultras of Central Asia
 List of mountains in Mongolia

References

External links
 "Myangan Yamaat, Mongolia" on Peakbagger

Mountains of Mongolia
Altai Mountains
Övörkhangai Province